Arthmius is a genus of ant-loving beetles in the family Staphylinidae. There are about nine described species in Arthmius.

Species
These nine species belong to the genus Arthmius:
 Arthmius bulbifer Casey, 1894
 Arthmius extraneus Fletcher
 Arthmius globicollis LeConte, 1849
 Arthmius gracilior Casey, 1884
 Arthmius involutus Casey, 1894
 Arthmius mancus Fletcher
 Arthmius morsus Fletcher, 1932
 Arthmius rubriculus Fletcher
 Arthmius subfusus Fletcher

References

Further reading

 
 

Pselaphinae
Articles created by Qbugbot